The 1974 Limerick Senior Hurling Championship was the 80th staging of the Limerick Senior Hurling Championship since its establishment by the Limerick County Board.

Kilmallock were the defending champions.

On 17 November 1974, Kilmallock won the championship after a 2-09 to 3-05 defeat of Patrickswell in the final. It was their fourth championship title overall and their second title in succession.

Results

Final

References

Limerick Senior Hurling Championship
Limerick Senior Hurling Championship